1981 Extended Play is the debut EP by American rock duo I Dont Know How But They Found Me, released on November 9, 2018 via Fearless Records.

Background
On October 26, 2017, the duo released the single “Choke" as a follow-up to their debut single “Modern Day Cain”. “Choke” would later be re-released with new artwork alongside the next single, “Do It All the Time” in August 2018. On March 14, 2018 the song "Nobody Likes The Opening Band" and accompanying music video were released as a free download on the band’s website, but would not appear on any official releases until 2020's Razzmatazz.

1981 EP was officially announced on October 12, 2018, the same day the music video for “Do It All the Time” was released. The third and final single from the EP, "Bleed Magic", was released on October 26, 2018. On physical copies of the EP, the track "Choke" has a sample of the 1973 British Public Information short film, Lonely Water, at the very end.

Track listing

Personnel
Dallon Weekes – lead vocals, guitars, bass guitar, keyboards, programming, production
Ryan Seaman – drums, percussion, backup vocals

Charts

Release history

References 

2018 EPs
I Dont Know How But They Found Me albums
Fearless Records EPs